Avis de réception (English: advice or acknowledgment of receipt) is a postal service returning to the sender a form or card signed by the recipient. This is evidence that the letter was received, and these forms (or cards) are frequently seen with legal endorsements. It had existed under various names in some postal entities as early as the late 18th century, and was adopted by the GPU General Postal Union in 1875, and again by its successor, the UPU Universal Postal Union in 1879.

Equivalent terms include aviso de recibo, acknowledgment of receipt (Canada), advice of receipt, advice of delivery (UK and much of the Commonwealth), return receipt requested/required/wanted/demanded (US), Rückschein (Germany), ricevuta di ritorno (Italy), zwrotne potwierdzenie odbioru (Poland), aviso de recepción (Salvador 1897 stamps), and many others. The term accusé de réception is sometimes seen, although it is inaccurate. The standard abbreviations are AR and AD.

Collecting
While obscure in some countries (such as Canada, Great Britain, and Australia), AR has always been very popular in others, including India, France and its territories, and especially the United States. There is a great deal of postal history material associated with the AR service: postmarks, AR forms & cards, AR covers, AR covering envelopes for returning AR forms (in use until the early to middle 1920s), rates, and practices. The service is still offered by many national post offices and postal stationery continues to be issued in connection with it.

Gallery

See also
Proof of delivery
Return receipt, email equivalent

References

Further reading

Handelman, David. (2002) AR—avis de réception. Ottawa: Postal History Society of Canada. According to Handelman six postal entities have issued stamps intended to pay the AR fee.

Postal services
Philatelic terminology